Connie Black McHugh (December 8, 1938 – September 20, 1997) was a former Republican member of the Pennsylvania House of Representatives.
 She died of lung cancer in 1997.

References

Republican Party members of the Pennsylvania House of Representatives
Women state legislators in Pennsylvania
1997 deaths
1938 births
20th-century American politicians
20th-century American women politicians